The Malayalam Wikipedia is the Malayalam edition of Wikipedia, a free and publicly editable online encyclopedia, and was launched on December 21, 2002. The project is the leading Wikipedia among other South Asian language Wikipedias in various quality matrices. It has grown to be a wiki containing  articles , and ranks 13th in terms of depth among Wikipedias.

History

Beginning 
Malayalam language Wikipedia is available in the wikipedia.org domain from 2002 December 21. User Vinod M. P. had taken initiatives for it. For the two years following its creation, he had been the key person striving to keep the wiki active. Almost all the early users of Malayalam Wikipedia were  non-resident Malayalees. The growth of the Wikipedia during these times was heavily constrained due to OS and browser related issues, rendering issues, Unicode related issues, and so on.

Initial growth phase
By the middle of 2002, unicode and input tools had become popular. Blogging in Malayalam became widespread. Wikipedians started to use these tools and the Wikipedia reached 100 articles by December 2004. More users joined by the middle of 2005 and the wiki had its first sysop by September 2005. He became the first bureaucrat of the wiki after a month and the wiki became self-sufficient in terms of administration.

The year 2006 saw a number of users joining the wiki, following the widespread usage of Malayalam computing tools. 500th article was born on April 10, 2006; the following September the article count reached 1000. On January 15, 2007, this became 2000 and on June 30 it became 3000.

Media coverage and increased growth 

The first major Media coverage about the Malayalam Wikipedia was on September 2, 2007, when Malayalam daily newspaper Mathrubhumi covered Malayalam Wikipedia project extensively in its Sunday Supplement. This generated significant interest in the Wikipedia project and large number of users joined the project and started to contribute. The subsequent growth was exponential.

While the article count increased, extreme care was taken to maintain the quality of articles. The page depth of the wiki remains high at 301. When the Wikipedia crossed 10,000 articles on June 1, 2009, a number of print and online newspapers covered the story. Malayalam daily newspaper Madhyamam spent an editorial for the contributors of Malayalam Wikipedia. The mobile version of the Malayalam Wikipedia was launched in February 2010.

Fonts and input methods 
Although many Malayalam Unicode fonts are available for old and new Malayalam lipi, most users opt for fonts like AnjaliOldLipi, Rachana and Meera which follows the traditional Malayalam writing style. Early editors adopted specialized Malayalam Unicode input tools based on the Varamozhi keyboard, a phonetic transliteration device. The project has an inbuilt input tool integrated to it.

Users and editors

See also
 Britannica Malayalam Encyclopedia
 Sarvavijnanakosam
 Hindi Wikipedia
 Tamil Wikipedia
 Telugu Wikipedia
 Kannada Wikipedia
 Bengali Wikipedia
 Punjabi Wikipedia (Eastern)
 Marathi Wikipedia

References

External links 

 Main page
  Malayalam Wikipedia mobile version
Download Malayalam Fonts

Wikipedias by language
Malayalam-language mass media
Malayalam encyclopedias
Internet properties established in 2002
Wikipedia in India